Cecilia "Cissi" Wallin (born 12 March 1985 in Uddevalla to Polish parents) is a Swedish actress, television and radio personality.

She made her film debut in 2005 with the role as the character "Millan" in Ulf Malmros film Tjenare Kungen. She also had a role in the film Sommaren med Göran alongside David Hellenius. She has also been a presenter for the Radio 1 radio station. She also operates the C. Wallin Production A/S media company along with Daniel Breitholtz.

She was sentenced by the Stockholm District Court to probation and made to pay over 110,000 SEK in damages for grave defamation. The case revolved around her publications on Instagram during the #MeToo period. She claimed journalist Fredrik Virtanen raped her in 2006, which she reported to police in 2011, where he was not prosecuted due to difficulties to prove the case. Wallin said she would appeal the conviction. 

The case centered around the Swedish defamation law, where even if a story is true it can be considered defamatory if there is not enough public interest in its publication.

Wallin's legal case has drawn international attention. In 2022, after her conviction, The New York Times published an article about Wallin and Sweden's "MeToo" movement.

Filmography
2005 - Tjenare Kungen
2009 - Sommaren med Göran - En midsommarnattskomedi

References

External links

Living people
1985 births
People from Uddevalla Municipality
Swedish film actresses
Swedish radio presenters
Swedish women radio presenters